Perama is a genus of flowering plants in the family Rubiaceae. The genus is found in the Caribbean and southern tropical America.

Species

Perama carajensis J.H.Kirkbr.
Perama dichotoma Poepp.
Perama galioides (Kunth) Poir.
Perama harleyi J.H.Kirkbr.
Perama hirsuta Aubl.
Perama holosericea (Naudin) Wurdack & Steyerm.
Perama humilis Benth.
Perama irwiniana J.H.Kirkbr.
Perama mexiae Standl. ex Steyerm.
Perama parviflora (Standl.) J.H.Kirkbr.
Perama plantaginea (Kunth) Hook.f.
Perama schultesii Steyerm.
Perama sparsiflora Standl. ex Steyerm.
Perama wurdackii Steyerm.

References

Rubioideae
Rubiaceae genera